The 2022 Utah Tech Trailblazers football team represented Utah Tech University (formerly Dixie State University) as a member of the Western Athletic Conference (WAC) during the 2022 NCAA Division I FCS football season. They were led by head coach Paul Peterson, who was coaching his fourth season overall with the program. The Trailblazers played their home games at Greater Zion Stadium in St. George, Utah. This was their first season playing under the Utah Tech name.

Schedule
Utah Tech and the WAC announced the 2022 football schedule on January 12, 2022.

References

Utah Tech Trailblazers
Utah Tech Trailblazers football seasons
Utah Tech Trailblazers football